Birketts LLP is one of the oldest law firms based in the UK. It was established in 1863 by Benjamin Birkett. The firm is often cited by the mainstream media for opinions and analysis on notable cases.

Overview
Birketts is a full-service law firm headquartered in Ipswich with additional offices in Cambridge, Chelmsford, London, and Norwich. Their business is divided into four main disciplines which are corporate and commercial, commercial property, commercial and personal litigation, and private client.

It is regulated by the Solicitors Regulation Authority and is accredited by Lexcel and ISO/IEC 27001. In the financial year ending 31 May 2020, they had a gross turnover of £58.4m.

References

External links
Birketts Official Website
Work Accident Advice Centre

1863 establishments in the United Kingdom
British companies established in 1863
Law firms of the United Kingdom
Law firms established in 1863